The Camp Ouachita Girl Scout Camp Historic District encompasses a campground area built by crews of the Civilian Conservation Corps in the 1930s on the northern shore of Lake Sylvia, a man-made lake in the eastern part of Ouachita National Forest.  The center of the campground, including its Great Hall and administration buildings, is located at the northern tip of Lake Sylvia, with cabins, comfort facilities, and other infrastructure arrayed around the northern and western sides of the lake.  It was the first Girl Scout camp in the state, and is a well-preserved example of the Rustic style of architecture for which the CCC is known.

The district was listed on the National Register of Historic Places in 1992.

See also
National Register of Historic Places listings in Perry County, Arkansas

References

Historic districts on the National Register of Historic Places in Arkansas
National Register of Historic Places in Perry County, Arkansas
Ouachita National Forest
Rustic architecture in Arkansas
Civilian Conservation Corps in Arkansas
1930s establishments in Arkansas
Summer camps in Arkansas
Local council camps of the Girls Scouts of the USA